The Glattwang is a mountain of the Plessur Alps, overlooking Fideris in the canton of Graubünden.

References

External links
Glattwang on Hikr

Mountains of the Alps
Mountains of Switzerland
Mountains of Graubünden
Two-thousanders of Switzerland